Groner is a surname. Notable people with the surname include:

Duke Groner (1908–1992), American jazz bassist and vocalist
Duncan Lawrence Groner (1873–1957), American judge
Emil Gröner (1892–1944), German football player
Frank Shelby Groner (1877–1943), American lawyer and pastor
Grace Groner (1909–2010), American philanthropist
Leib Groner (1931 – April 7, 2020) secretary of Menachem Mendel Schneerson (the Lubavitcher Rebbe).
Leif Grøner (1884–1971), Norwegian banker and politician 
Lissy Gröner (born 1954), German politician
R. N. Groner (1876-1930), American football coach
Rudolf Groner (born 1942), Swiss psychologist
Sverre Grøner (1890–1972), Norwegian gymnast
Yitzchok Dovid Groner (1925–2008), Australian rabbi